The 2005–06 Slovenian Ice Hockey League was the 15th season of the Slovenian Hockey League. Ten teams participated in the league, and Jesenice have won the league championships.

First round

Second round

Play-offs

Final
Jesenice – Slavija (2–3, 6–3, 3–2, 3–2, 7–0)

3rd place
Olimpija – Alfa (4–3, 9–1, 7–0)

References
2005–06 season on hockeyarchives.info

1
Slovenia
Slovenian Ice Hockey League seasons